In the C++ programming language, seekg is a function in the fstream library (part of the standard library) that allows you to seek to an arbitrary position in a file. This function is defined for ifstream class - for ofstream class there's a similar function seekp (this is to avoid conflicts in case of classes that derive both istream and ostream, such as iostream).

istream&  seekg(streampos position);
istream&  seekg(streamoff offset, ios_base::seekdir dir);

 position is the new position in the stream buffer. This parameter is an object of type streampos. 
 offset is an integer value of type streamoff representing the offset in the stream's buffer. It is relative to the dir parameter. 
dir is the seeking direction. It is an object of type ios_base::seekdir that can take any of the following constant values: 
ios_base::beg (offset from the beginning of the stream's buffer). 
ios_base::cur (offset from the current position in the stream's buffer). 
ios_base::end (offset from the end of the stream's buffer).

Note: If you have previously got an end of file on the stream, seekg will not reset it but will return an error in many implementations.
- use the clear() method to clear the end of file bit first. This is a relatively common mistake and if seekg() is not performing as expected, it is wise to clear the fail bit, as shown below.

Example of seekg
#include <fstream>
#include <iostream>

int main()
{
    // Open a new file for input/output operations discarding any current
    // content in the file (assumes a length of zero on opening)
    std::fstream myFile("test.txt", std::ios::in | std::ios::out | std::ios::trunc);
    
    // Add the characters "Hello World" to the file
    myFile << "Hello World";
    
    // Seek to 6 characters from the beginning of the file
    myFile.seekg(6, std::ios::cur);
    
    // Read the next 5 characters from the file into a buffer
    char buffer[6];
    myFile.read(buffer, 5);
    
    // End the buffer with a null terminating character
    buffer[5] = 0;
    
    // Output the contents read from the file and close it 
    std::cout << buffer << std::endl;
    
    myFile.close();
}

Example clearing the fail bit
#include <fstream>
#include <iostream>
#include <string>

int main()
{
    std::string line;

    // Creates a new ifstream object and associates it with a file passed in via the parameters.
    // The object is then checked to see if the end-of-file has been reached, if the file has data
    // then this will be false.
    std::ifstream myFile(argv[1], std::ios::in);
    std::cout << myFile.eof() << std::endl;
    
    // Continuously loops over each line of the file until the end of the file
    while (!myFile.eof()) {
        std::getline(myFile, line);
    }    
    
    // Again outputs the end-of-file status for the stream, this time the answer will be true
    std::cout << myFile.eof() << std::endl;
    
    // Seeks to the very beginning of the file, clearing any fail bits first (such as the end-of-file bit)
    myFile.clear();
    myFile.seekg(0, std::ios::beg);
    
    // Outputs the status of the stream again, the result will be false
    std::cout << myFile.eof() << std::endl;
    
    myFile.close();
}

C++
Articles with example C++ code